Saint-Louis-du-Nord is an arrondissement in the Nord-Ouest department of Haiti. As of 2015, the population was 146,567 inhabitants. Postal codes in the Saint-Louis-du-Nord Arrondissement start with the number 32.

The arondissement consists of the following municipalities:
 Saint-Louis-du-Nord
 Anse-à-Foleur

References

Arrondissements of Haiti
Nord-Ouest (department)